Namibia made its Paralympic Games début at the 1992 Summer Paralympics in Barcelona. These were the first Summer Paralympics to be held since the country's accession to independence from South Africa in 1990, and thus the first Games in which Namibia was able to take part. For its inaugural participation, the country sent just two athletes, both women, who both competed in discus, javelin and shot put. They did not win any medals.

Namibia was then absent from the Paralympics until 2004, when it entered a single representative in men's powerlifting. It returned in 2008, with a single competitor, Reginald Benade, in men's discus and shot put. Benade won Namibia's first Paralympic medal: a bronze in the discus.

Namibia achieved its first Paralympic gold medal in the 2012 London Summer Paralympics.  Johanna Benson, at the time Namibia's only female athlete, won the 200 meter race in her division.  

Namibia competed in the 2016 Rio de Janeiro Paralympics, earning two silver and two gold medals in athletics categories.   

Namibia has never taken part in the Winter Paralympics.

Medallists

See also
 Namibia at the Olympics

References